Seats were administrative divisions in the medieval Kingdom of Hungary. The seats were autonomous regions within the Kingdom, and were independent from the feudal county system. Their autonomy was granted in return for the military services they provided to the Hungarian Kings.

The following divisions were at one point Székely seats:

 Marosszék
 Udvarhelyszék
 Csíkszék
 Gyergyószék
 
 Sepsiszék
 Orbaiszék
 Kézdiszék
 Aranyosszék

Seats were formed by the:

 Székelys
 Transylvanian Saxons
 Cumans
 Jassic people
 Ten Lance Bearers

Most seats gave up their autonomous status and military traditions in late medieval times and paid tax instead.

Medieval Kingdom of Hungary
Former administrative divisions of countries